La Réole is a railway station in La Réole, Nouvelle-Aquitaine, France. The station is located on the Bordeaux–Sète railway line. The station is served by TER (local) services operated by SNCF.

Train services
The following services currently call at La Réole:
local service (TER Nouvelle-Aquitaine) Bordeaux - Langon - Marmande - Agen

References

Railway stations in Gironde